Leslie Landon Matthews ( Landon) is an American former actress. She had a supporting role on the Little House on the Prairie television series, in which her father, Michael Landon, played the lead.

Career 
Born in Los Angeles, Matthews is notable for her portrayal of schoolteacher Etta Plum on Little House on the Prairie from 1982 to 1984. She also made small guest appearances in four other episodes of Little House between 1975 and 1981.

Personal life 
Landon's parents are actor-director Michael and Lynn Landon. Landon has eight siblings.  Two brothers, Michael Landon Jr. and Christopher Landon, and a sister, Shawna Leigh Landon, from her parents' marriage. From her mother's first marriage, Landon has  another half-sister, Cheryl Lynn Landon.  From her father's marriage to Cindy Landon, she has a half-sister, Jennifer Landon, and a half-brother, Sean Matthew Landon.  She has an adopted brother, Mark Landon (now deceased) as well as a half-brother, Josh Landon, both from her father's first marriage to Dodie Fraser. Her paternal grandfather was Jewish, whereas her paternal grandmother was Catholic, although her father was raised Jewish.

Landon married Brian Matthews in 1990. Her eldest daughter, born in 1993, Rachel Matthews, is also an actress, with her film debut in Happy Death Day that was directed by her uncle Christopher.

Landon obtained a BA in psychology and an MA in clinical psychology from Pepperdine University and a Ph.D. in marriage and family therapy from the California Graduate Institute.

Filmography 
Little House on the Prairie
1975: Plague Victim in "The Plague" (season 1)
1977: Kate in "The Election" (season 3)
1979: Marge in "The Third Miracle" (season 6)
1981: Pam in "A Wiser Heart" (season 8)
1982–83: Etta Plum, 15 episodes (season 9)
1983: Etta Plum in Little House: Look Back to Yesterday (TV movie)
1984: Etta Plum in Little House: Bless All the Dear Children (TV movie)
1984: Etta Plum in Little House: The Last Farewell (TV movie)
Father Murphy
1982: Kate Jones in "The Dream Day"

Bibliography 
 When Children Grieve: For Adults to Help Children Deal with Death, Divorce, Pet Loss, Moving, and Other Losses. By John W. James, Russell Friedman, Dr. Leslie Matthews. HarperCollins, 2001.

References

External links 

Actresses from Greater Los Angeles
American people of Jewish descent
21st-century American psychologists
American women psychologists
American television actresses
Living people
Michael Landon family
Pepperdine University alumni
21st-century American women
Year of birth missing (living people)
20th-century American psychologists